Satori is a jazz album by saxophonist Lee Konitz. It was originally released in 1975 on Milestone label as MSP 9060 and remastered in 1997. The album features some classic jazz standards besides other experimental compositions such as "Satori". Three of the seven tracks are Konitz compositions.

Track listing
"Just Friends" (John Klenner/Sam M. Lewis) – 7:02
"On Green Dolphin Street" (Bronisław Kaper/Ned Washington) – 5:44
"Satori" (Konitz/Holland/Katz/DeJohnette/Solal) – 9:04
"Sometime Ago" (Sergio Mihanovich) – 7:20
"What's New"(Bob Haggart) – 3:24
"Hymn" (Konitz) – 2:45
"Free Blues" (Konitz) – 7:50

Personnel
Lee Konitz – alto sax, soprano sax (tracks 3, 4 & 7), tenor sax (tracks 3 and 5)
Martial Solal – piano, electric piano (track 4)
Dick Katz – electric piano (track 3)
David Holland – bass
Jack DeJohnette – drums

References

1975 albums
Milestone Records albums
Lee Konitz albums
Jack DeJohnette albums